Aristo (or Ariston) of Alexandria was a Peripatetic philosopher who lived in the 1st century BC. According to Philodemus, he was a pupil of Antiochus of Ascalon.  Strabo, a later contemporary, relates a story  where both Ariston and Eudorus, a contemporary of his, had claimed to have written a work on the Nile, but that the two works were so nearly identical that the authors charged each other with plagiarism. Who was right is not said, though Strabo seems to be inclined to think that Eudorus was the guilty party.

References

1st-century philosophers
Roman-era Alexandrians
Roman-era Peripatetic philosophers